Gottfried Wilhelm Bitzer (April 21, 1872 – April 29, 1944) was an American cinematographer, notable for his close association and pioneering work with D. W. Griffith.

Biography
Prior to his career as a cameraman, working as a motion picture projectionist, Bitzer developed early cinematic technologies for the American Mutoscope Company, eventually to become the Biograph Company. He admired and learned the art of motion picture photography from Kinetoscope inventor W. K. L. Dickson, who directed the early Biograph shorts on which Bitzer cut his teeth. Bitzer achieved success in 1896 when his film of William McKinley being notified of the presidential nomination of his party was exhibited on the Biograph Company’s first program. Until 1903, Bitzer was employed by Biograph primarily as a documentary photographer, and from 1903 onward primarily as the photographer of narrative films, as these gained popularity.

In 1908 Bitzer entered into his first collaboration with Griffith. The two would work together for the rest of Bitzer's career, leaving Biograph in 1913 for the Mutual Film Corporation where Bitzer continued to innovate, perfecting existing technologies and inventing new ones. During this time he pioneered the field of matte photography and made use of innovative lighting techniques, closeups, and iris shots.

Bitzer provided assistance during Griffith's directorial debut, 1908's The Adventures of Dollie, which was shot by Arthur Marvin. He eventually succeeded Marvin as Griffith's regular cinematographer, working with him on some of his most important films and contributing significantly to cinematic innovations attributed to Griffith. In 1910, he photographed Griffith's silent short In Old California in the Los Angeles village of "Hollywoodland", qualifying Bitzer as, arguably, Hollywood's first Director of Photography. The apex of Bitzer and Griffith's collaboration came with The Birth of a Nation (1915), a film funded in part by Bitzer's life savings, and the epic Intolerance (1916).

His film The Jeffries-Sharkey Fight of 1899 is the first known use of artificial light. Rip Van Winkle (1903) features the first known close-up. Advances in lenses and filters developed by Bitzer made soft focus possible. He was the first to use split-screen photography and backlighting, contributing to the development of three-point lighting. He improved in-camera fade and dissolve effects and invented what came to be known as transition tools. Even after the Bell & Howell Model 2709 production camera became the industry standard, he continued to use a Pathe.

For all his innovation, Bitzer's career did not survive the industry's transition to sound. In 1944, he suffered a heart attack and died in Hollywood.

His autobiography, Billy Bitzer: His Story, was published posthumously in 1973.

In 2003, a survey conducted by the International Cinematographers Guild named him one of the ten most influential cinematographers in history. Bitzer, it is said, "developed camera techniques that set the standard for all future motion pictures".

Selected filmography

The Moonshiner (1904)
2 A. M. in the Subway (1905)
The Kentuckian (1908)
The Lonely Villa (1909)
A Sound Sleeper (1909)
The Sealed Room (1909)
Edgar Allan Poe (1909)
A Corner in Wheat (1909)
In the Border States (1910)
The Modern Prodigal (1910)
A Mohawk's Way (1910)
The Lonedale Operator (1911)
Enoch Arden (1911)
The Girl and Her Trust (1912)
The Female of the Species (1912)
A Beast at Bay (1912)
The Root of Evil (1912)
An Unseen Enemy (1912)
The Painted Lady (1912)
The Musketeers of Pig Alley (1912)
The House of Darkness (1913)
Death's Marathon (1913)
The Mothering Heart (1913)
The Yaqui Cur (1913)
The Battle at Elderbush Gulch (1914)
Judith of Bethulia (1914)
The Avenging Conscience (1914)
The Birth of a Nation (1915)
Intolerance (1916)
Hearts of the World (1918)
The Great Love (1918)
The Greatest Thing in Life (1918)
A Romance of Happy Valley (1919)
The Girl Who Stayed at Home (1919)
True Heart Susie (1919)
Scarlet Days (1919)
Broken Blossoms (1919)
The Greatest Question (1919)
The Idol Dancer (1920)
The Love Flower (1920)
Way Down East (1920)
The White Rose (1923)
America (1924)
Drums of Love (1927)
The Battle of the Sexes (1928)
Lady of the Pavements (1929)

References

Further reading
 G. W. Bitzer (as Billy Bitzer). Billy Bitzer: His Story. New York: Farrar, Straus and Giroux, 1973.

External links

 

1872 births
1944 deaths
American cinematographers
People from Roxbury, Boston
Articles containing video clips
American people of German descent